Joel Armstrong (born 25 September 1981) is a footballer who played in The Football League for Chesterfield.

Career
Armstrong started his career at his local team Chesterfield where he made six appearances. He spent time on loan at Ilkeston and Bradford Park Avenue before being released by Chesterfield in 2002. Since then, he has played for Staveley Miners Welfare, Matlock Town, Sheffield and Ossett Town.

References

External links

English footballers
Chesterfield F.C. players
Ilkeston Town F.C. (1945) players
Staveley Miners Welfare F.C. players
Matlock Town F.C. players
Sheffield F.C. players
Ossett Town F.C. players
English Football League players
1981 births
Living people
Association football goalkeepers
Bradford (Park Avenue) A.F.C. players